Maxwell Rolston Marston (June 12, 1892 – May 7, 1949) was an American amateur golfer. He worked as an investment banker in Philadelphia.  He was a member of the Cranford Golf Club in Cranford, New Jersey and lived on Central Avenue in the town.

In the 1923 U.S. Amateur at Flossmoor Country Club, Marston defeated three former or future Amateur champions: Bobby Jones (1924, 1925, 1927, 1928, 1930), Francis Ouimet (1931), and Jess Sweetser (1922) in the final (38th hole). He reached the final again in 1933, losing to George Dunlap, 6 and 5. Marston, who took lessons from James Maiden,   also won the New Jersey Amateur twice and the Pennsylvania Amateur three times.

Marston played on the first three Walker Cup teams and again in 1934.

He is the namesake of the annual Marston Cup, a tournament for golfers 55 and older run by the Golf Association of Philadelphia.

Death
Marston died on May 7, 1949 in Old Lyme, Connecticut, aged 56.

Amateur wins
Note: This list may be incomplete.
1915 New Jersey Amateur
1919 New Jersey Amateur
1921 Pennsylvania Amateur
1922 Pennsylvania Amateur
1923 U.S. Amateur, Pennsylvania Amateur

U.S. national team appearances
Walker Cup: 1922 (winners), 1923 (winners), 1924 (winners), 1934 (winners)

References

American male golfers
Amateur golfers
Golfers from New York (state)
Golfers from New Jersey
American investment bankers
Sportspeople from Buffalo, New York
Golfers from Philadelphia
Sportspeople from Union County, New Jersey
People from Cranford, New Jersey
1892 births
1949 deaths